Ambrose Spencer (December 13, 1765March 13, 1848) was an American lawyer and politician.

Early life
Ambrose Spencer was born on December 13, 1765 in Salisbury in the Connecticut Colony. He was the son of Philip Spencer and Mary (née Moore) Spencer. His brother was Philip Spencer.

James B. Spencer (1781–1848), also a U.S Representative, was a distant cousin of his.

He attended Yale College from 1779–82, and graduated from Harvard University in 1783.  He studied law with John Canfield (ca.1740-1786) at Sharon, Connecticut, with John Bay at Claverack, New York, and with Ezekiel Gilbert at Hudson, New York.

Career
He was admitted to the bar and commenced practice in Hudson, New York, where he was city clerk from 1786 until 1793.  He was a member of the New York State Assembly from 1793–95, and of the New York State Senate from 1795 to 1804.

From 1796 to 1801, he was Assistant Attorney General for the Third District, comprising Columbia and Rensselaer counties.  He was New York Attorney General from 1802 to 1804. From 1804 to 1819, he was an associate justice of the New York Supreme Court, and chief justice from 1819 until the end of 1822.  He was legislated out of office by the State Constitution of 1821.  Governor Joseph C. Yates nominated him to be re-appointed, but this was rejected by Bucktails majority in the State Senate, Spencer having been the longtime leader of the Clintonians.

Spencer was a presidential elector in 1808 and a delegate to the New York State Constitutional Convention of 1821.  On March 8, 1824, he was elected Mayor of Albany, over John Lansing, Jr., taking office on March 10, 1824.  He was reelected on January 1, 1825 and served until January 1, 1826.

United States Congress
In 1825, he was the Clintonian candidate for U.S. Senator from New York, and received a majority in the State Assembly. The Bucktails majority in the State Senate did not nominate any candidate, thus preventing Spencer's election on joint ballot. The seat remained vacant until the election of Nathan Sanford in 1826. Afterwards Spencer resumed the practice of law in Albany.

He was elected to the 21st United States Congress, serving from March 4, 1829, to March 3, 1831; during this Congress, he was a member of the Committee on Agriculture.  He was one of the managers appointed by the House of Representatives in 1830 to conduct the impeachment proceedings against Judge James H. Peck of the U.S. District Court for the District of Missouri.

Later life
In 1839, he moved to Lyons, New York, and engaged in agricultural pursuits. He presided over the 1844 Whig National Convention in Baltimore, Maryland.

Personal life
On February 18, 1784, he married Laura Canfield (1768–1807), the daughter of John Canfield (1740–1786) and Dorcas (née Buell) Canfield (1742–1812). Together, they were the parents of:

 John Canfield Spencer (1788–1855), who was U.S. Secretary of War and U.S. Secretary of the Treasury under President John Tyler.
 Abigail "Abby" Spencer (1790–1839), who married Albany Mayor John Townsend.
 William Augustus Spencer (1792–1854), who was married to Eleanora Eliza Lorillard (1801–1843), the daughter of Peter Abraham Lorillard
 Ambrose Spencer, Jr. (1795–1814), who served as aide-de-camp to Major-General Jacob Jennings Brown during the War of 1812.
 Theodore Spencer (1800–), an attorney who became a Presbyterian minister who married Catharine Vosburgh, daughter of Myndert T. Vosburgh.
 Laura Isabella Spencer (1803–1825), who married Robert Gilchrist, of New York.

After the death of Ambrose's first wife in 1807, in 1808 he married Mary Clinton (1773–1808), the daughter of James Clinton and sister of New York Governor DeWitt Clinton, who had previously been married to Robert Burrage Norton.  After Mary's early death, he married her sister Katherine Clinton (1778–1837), who had previously been married to Samuel Lake Norton.

In 1848, he died in Lyons and was buried at the Albany Rural Cemetery in Menands, New York.

Legacy
The University of Pennsylvania awarded him the degree of LL.D. in 1819, and Harvard the same in 1821.  The town of Spencer in New York is named after him.

Descendants
His grandson, Philip Spencer (1823–1842), was executed for mutiny in 1842.  He was the grandfather of Lorrilard Spencer (1827–1888), great-grandfather of Lorrilard Spencer (1860–1912), who was married to Caroline Berryman Spencer, and 2x great-grandfather of Lorillard Spencer (1883–1939), who was president of Atlantic Aircraft and was married to Katherine Emmons Force (1891–1956), both of whom were prominent in Newport, Rhode Island society.

References

External links

 
 
 Clinton genealogy
 Clinton genealogy, at rootsweb
 List of NY State Attorneys General, at Office of the Att. Gal. of NY
 The American Almanac and Repository of Useful Knowledge for the Year 1849 (page 338, Charles C. Little & James Brown, Boston, 1848)
 Canfield genealogy
 

19th-century American politicians
1765 births
1848 deaths
Burials at Albany Rural Cemetery
County district attorneys in New York (state)
Harvard University alumni
Mayors of Albany, New York
Members of the New York State Assembly
National Republican Party members of the United States House of Representatives from New York (state)
New York State Attorneys General
New York (state) state senators
New York Supreme Court Justices
People from Lyons, New York
People from Salisbury, Connecticut
1808 United States presidential electors
Yale College alumni
Spencer family of New York